The 1938 Grand Prix season was the sixth AIACR European Championship season. The championship was won by Rudolf Caracciola, driving for the Mercedes-Benz team. Caracciola won one of the four events that counted towards the championship.

Season review

European Championship Grands Prix

Non-championship Grands Prix

Grandes Épreuves are denoted by a yellow background.

Championship final standings

References

 
 
 

Grand Prix seasons